The Kaiser Wilhelm Memorial Medal also known as the Centenary Medal ( Zentenarmedaille) was established on March 22, 1897, by Wilhelm II on the occasion of the 100th Birthday of his grandfather, Emperor Wilhelm I.

The medal was awarded by Prussia to state and university officials, as well as all military officers, non-commissioned officers and enlisted personnel, which were actively serving in army, navy and Schutztruppe.  Medals were also awarded to the surviving veterans of the First Schleswig War, Second Schleswig War, Austro-Prussian War, and the Franco-Prussian War.

Appearance
The medal is made of bronze gunmetal from captured cannon.  It is 40 mm in diameter and was suspended from a ribbon 36 mm wide.

The obverse is a right facing effigy of Wilhelm I in military uniform wearing a mantle and Pickelhaube.
To the left of the effigy is the inscription WILHELM / DER / GROSSE / DEUTSCHE / KAISER (William the Great German Emperor).  To the right is KOENIG / VON / PREUSSEN (King of Prussia).

The reverse depicts symbols of royal authority including the German State Crown, an orb, sword, and scepter placed upon a pillow surrounded by oak leaves, in the lower half of the medal.  To the left is an upward climbing laurel branch.  In the upper half is the inscription in six lines ZUM ANDENKEN AN DEN HUNDERTSTEN GEBURTSTAG DES GROSSEN KAISERS WILHELM I. 1797 22.MAERZ 1897 (IN MEMORY OF THE HUNDREDTH BIRTHDAY THE GREAT EMPEROR WILHELM I. 1797–MARCH 22–1897).

References

Orders, decorations, and medals of Prussia
1897 establishments in Prussia
Awards established in 1897